Loch Leven is a settlement near St. Fintans. It had a population of 35 in 1951.

See also
 List of communities in Newfoundland and Labrador

Populated places in Newfoundland and Labrador